Mikayil Aliyev ((born 26 January 1994) is an Azerbaijani taekwondo practitioner.

Aliyev won the silver medal at the 2012 European Taekwondo Championships in the men's finweight (under 54 kg) class. At the 2013 Islamic Solidarity Games held in Palembang, Indonesia, he won the bronze medal in the -54 kg division.

References

External links
The-Sports.org

1994 births
Living people
Azerbaijani male taekwondo practitioners
European Taekwondo Championships medalists
Islamic Solidarity Games medalists in taekwondo
21st-century Azerbaijani people